The 2022–23 Bangladesh Championship League is the 11th season of the Bangladesh Championship League since its establishment in 2012. A total of 11 football clubs will be competing in the league.

Fortis FC were the champion of previous 2021–22 season.

Team changes
The following teams have changed division since the previous season:

To BCL
Directly promoted
Fortis FC Academy
Little Friends Club
Relegated from the BPL
Uttar Baridhara SC
Swadhinata KS
Re-entry
 Brothers Union who were relegated after the 2021–22 Bangladesh Premier League, decided participate in the BCL this season after withdrawing from the previous edition.

From BCL
Promoted to the BPL
 AFC Uttara
 Fortis FC

Relegated to Dhaka Senior Division Football League
 Farashganj SC 
 Kawran Bazar PS

Retractation
 Agrani Bank Ltd. SC decided to quit from all kinds of football activities from the 2022–23 season.

Venue
All matches are playing at the BSSS Mostafa Kamal Stadium in Dhaka, Bangladesh

Team locations

League table

Results

Result Table

Positions by round
The following table lists the positions of teams after each week of matches. In order to preserve the chronological evolution, any postponed matches are not included to the round at which they were originally scheduled but added to the full round they were played immediately afterward.

Results by games

Season statistics

Goalscorers

Hat-tricks

See also

2022–23 Bangladesh Premier League
2022–23 Federation Cup (Bangladesh)
2022–23 Independence Cup (Bangladesh)

References

2022 in Bangladeshi football
2023 in Bangladeshi football
2023 in Bangladeshi sport
2023 in Bangladesh
2023 in association football
2023 in Asian football